The 2003 Liberal Democrats deputy leadership election took place in February 2003, following the decision by the incumbent, Alan Beith to stand down as Deputy Leader of the Liberal Democrats, a political party in the United Kingdom. The post was voted on by the party's then 53 Members of Parliament in the House of Commons.

The election was expected to be contested by Simon Hughes, who had come second in the 1999 leadership election, but in the event he declined to run, instead running to be Mayor of London in the 2004 elections. In the event the candidates were Menzies Campbell, the party's foreign affairs spokesperson, and Malcolm Bruce, spokesperson for Environment, Food and Rural Affairs.

Result

References

See also
2006 Liberal Democrats deputy leadership election

Liberal Democrat deputy leadership election
Deputy Leadership election 2003
Liberal Democrats deputy leadership election